The Singing Butler is an oil-on-canvas painting made by Scottish artist Jack Vettriano in 1992. It sold at auction in 2004 for £744,800, which was the record at the time for any Scottish painting, and for any painting ever sold in Scotland. Reproductions of The Singing Butler make it the best-selling art print in the UK.

The focal subject of The Singing Butler is based on an image of actress Orla Brady posing in her own dress which was published in The Illustrator's Figure Reference Manual (1987) as part of a series of photographic figure studies.

References

1992 paintings
Dance in art
Scottish paintings